Dar El Beïda is a suburb of Algiers, Algeria. It is the seat of the district with the same name. During French colonial times, it was officially called by its French name Maison Blanche, which meant the same thing as its current Arabic name: (the) white house. (This Arabic name is shared with Casablanca in Morocco, in that case a translation from Spanish).
It has an area of 3200 hectares (32 km²/12 sq mi). It is home to the international Houari Boumedienne Airport, the largest in Algeria. The airport is divided into two main terminals, one for international flights and the older one for domestic flights.
It has 44,753 inhabitants as of the 1998 census. In 1987 it had 12,900 inhabitants.

Economy
It is home to an industrial park which it shares with the neighboring municipality of Oued Smar. Historic municipal budgets include:
2003: 290 million DZD
2004: 320 million DZD
2005: 730 million DZD
2006: 750 million DZD
2007: 1.6 billion DZD

Notable people

References

Suburbs of Algiers
Communes of Algiers Province
Algiers Province